Ukraine Reform Conference is an annual international event dedicated to discussions on the progress with reforms in Ukraine. It is a conference for Ukrainian and foreign officials, including members of the European Union, North Atlantic Treaty Organization (NATO), The Group of Seven (G7), civil society representatives, members of the private sector, and think tanks. The objectives of the conference are to present results of key reforms in Ukraine, set out the priority of the Government of Ukraine's objectives for the upcoming year, encourage investment in the Ukrainian economy, and engage the international community in Ukrainian reforms.

The 5th Ukraine Reform Conference, renamed into the Ukraine Recovery Conference amid the Russian invasion, was held in Lugano, Switzerland on July 4–5, 2022.

History 

Following the 2014 Ukrainian revolution, Ukraine began undertaking reforms to reinforce security and democratic accountability. In 2017, Ukrainian Prime Minister Volodymyr Groysman initiated the first Ukraine Reform Conference as a tool for active engagement and collaboration with international organizations and foreign countries to support and implement reforms in Ukraine.

2022 conference 

Switzerland hosted the Ukraine Recovery Conference (URC2022) in Lugano from 4–5 July 2022.

The key motto of the URC2022 in Switzerland is "Reforms for All - All for Reforms." It emphasizes that a long-term success of the reforms in Ukraine depends on inclusiveness and shared responsibility among the central, regional and local authorities, private sector, academia, civil society, media and citizens themselves.

The conference in Lugano will focus on the following reform priorities:
 Stability (Eradicating corruption – Justice, rule of law and anti-corruption; Empowering municipalities – Decentralisation; Strengthening cohesion – Reforms for reintegration)
 Prosperity (Banking for the future – Banking and financial sector; Ensuring transparency in state-owned enterprises – Corporate governance; Going green – Green transition; Investing in people – Human capital)
 Digital transformation

2021 conference 
The fourth Ukraine Reform Conference was originally scheduled to be held on July 7, 2020 in Vilnius, Lithuania. However, due to complications from the COVID-19 pandemic, the conference was rescheduled for 2021.

Both President of Lithuania Gitanas Nausėda and President of Ukraine Volodymyr Zelensky attendees. Invitees included representatives from the following countries:

as well as representatives from the European Union, European Bank for Reconstruction and Development, Council of Europe, the International Monetary Fund, NATO, the Organisation for Economic Co-operation and Development(OECD), the Organization for Security and Co-operation in Europe, the United Nations Development Programme, the World Bank, the European Union Advisory Mission Ukraine, and the European Union Anti-Corruption Initiative in Ukraine.

The conference focused on developments after the 2019 Ukrainian presidential election, the ongoing War in Donbass, and policy objectives for the future.

2019 conference 
The third Ukraine Reform Conference was held on July 2–4, 2019 in Toronto, Canada.

There was more than 800 in attendance, including delegations from 37 countries and 10 international organizations. Among those in attendance included President of Ukraine Volodymyr Zelensky and Prime Minister of Canada Justin Trudeau, as well as representatives from the following countries:

as well as representatives from NATO, Council of Europe, International Monetary Fund, European Investment Bank, European Bank for Reconstruction and Development, OECD, Ukrainian World Congress, and the World Bank.

Key agenda items included:
Irreversibility of reforms in Ukraine
Decentralization reform, its opportunities, efficiency, and results
Ukraine on the path of integration into the Euro-Atlantic community
Innovations, opportunities and investing

2018 conference 
The second Ukraine Reform Conference was held on June 27, 2018 in Copenhagen, Denmark.

The conference was attended by:

As well as representatives from the United States, NATO, OECD, and other G7 and European countries.

The conference focused on affirming the international partnership with and support for a free and reformed Ukraine, and topics of good governance, economic development, and objectives for 2018–2019. Objectives included privatization of state owned enterprises, improved corporate governance, improving the business climate, land market reform, decentralization, anti-corruption, energy sector reform, infrastructure development, public administration reform and innovation and digital development.

2017 conference 
The first Ukraine Reform Conference was held on July 6, 2017 in London, United Kingdom. The opening session was attended by Prime Minister Groysman and United Kingdom Foreign Secretary Boris Johnson.

The themes of the conference were economic growth, good governance, human capital, rule of law and anti-corruption, and defense and security. This conference brought together Ukraine and its international partners to strengthen support for reform and transform Ukraine into a stable, transparent, prosperous democracy which can meet its citizens' aspirations and realise its full economic potential. The Government of Ukraine launched and committed itself to implement its Reform Action Plan 2017-2020.

See also 
2014 Ukrainian revolution
Euromaidan
Ukraine–European Union Association Agreement
Ukraine–NATO relations

References

External links
Official Ukraine Reform Conference 2022 Website
Government of Ukraine's Official Ukraine Reform Conference Website
:
 Remarks at the Ukraine Reform Conference (24 min 6 sec)

Foreign relations of Ukraine
2017 conferences
2018 conferences
2019 conferences